The Omidyar-Tufts Microfinance Fund is a microfinance investment firm established on 4 November 2005. eBay founder and social entrepreneur Pierre Omidyar and his wife Pam donated $100 million to their alma mater Tufts University to create the fund, which will offer millions of tiny loans to entrepreneurs in developing countries.

References

External links
Official site

Microfinance organizations